Halbert Eleazer Paine (February 4, 1826April 14, 1905) was an American lawyer and Republican politician.  He served as a Union Army general during the American Civil War, and after the war was elected to three terms in the United States House of Representatives representing Wisconsin's 1st congressional district.

Biography
Paine was born in Chardon, Ohio. Through his father's family, he was a first cousin of Eleazar A. Paine, who would also serve as a general in the Union Army in the Civil War. After attending the common schools, Paine graduated from Western Reserve College in 1845. He moved to Mississippi for a year to teach school but returned to Cleveland to read the law. In 1848 he passed the bar exam and established a practice. He married and started a family.

In 1857, Paine took his family to Milwaukee, Wisconsin, where he continued his legal career.  Beginning 1859, his law partner was Carl Schurz, though, with Paine's encouragement, Schurz took more of an interest in politics and public speaking than law.

American Civil War
With the outbreak of the Civil War, Paine entered the Union army as the colonel of the 4th Wisconsin Infantry Regiment. On April 9, 1863, President Abraham Lincoln appointed Paine brigadier general of volunteers, to rank from March 13, 1863. The President had nominated Paine for the promotion on March 12, 1863, and the U.S. Senate had confirmed the appointment on March 13, 1863.

Paine led widespread actions in the Lower Mississippi, which took him into Louisiana. These included involvement in the Vicksburg campaign, the capture of New Orleans, the Battle of Baton Rouge, and the Bayou Teche offensive. He also coordinated anti-guerrilla operations in southern Louisiana and Mississippi. In late-September 1862, Paine assumed command of the Camp Parapet, a fortification about ten miles north of New Orleans under overall command of Brigadier General Thomas W. Sherman, who was in command of New Orleans defenses.

With the Third Division of the Army of the Gulf, he took part in an assault on Priest Gap during the siege and Battle of Port Hudson in Louisiana. He suffered a wound that required amputation of his leg. After his recovery, Paine commanded troops in the defense of Washington, D.C., during Jubal A. Early's raid in 1864. He resigned from the army on May 15, 1865, and returned to Wisconsin.

On December 11, 1866, President Andrew Johnson nominated Paine for appointment to the brevet grade of major general of volunteers, to rank from March 13, 1865. The U.S. Senate confirmed the appointment on February 6, 1867.

Politics
Paine, a Republican, was elected to the 39th, 40th and 41st Congress from Wisconsin's 1st congressional district, serving from March 4, 1865, till March 3, 1871. He was a delegate to the 1866 National Union Convention in Philadelphia, which was attempting to encourage support for President Andrew Johnson in advance of the mid-term elections. Some attendees hoped to found a new political party, but this did not take place.

In 1869, Paine championed the passage of a bill that provided for taking meteorological observations in the interior of the continent. He served as chairman of the Committee on Militia (Fortieth Congress), and the Committee on Elections (Forty-first Congress). After the expiration of his third term in Congress, he retired from politics and chose not to accept renomination.

Law
After serving in Congress, Paine practiced law in Washington, D.C., for several years, having established residency there. In 1879, he was appointed by President Rutherford B. Hayes as the United States Commissioner of Patents, serving in that post for two years. While there, he promoted adoption by Federal agencies of useful innovations, such as typewriters.

Cases and memoir
In later years, Paine published two accounts of contested elections in which he had represented a candidate: Contested Election, Territory of Utah: George R. Maxwell V. George Q. Cannon (1888), and Contested Election, United States Senate: William H. Clagett v. Frederick T. Dubois, based on his argument before the Committee on Privileges and Elections. These were related to his work in Washington, DC.

In addition, he wrote a memoir of his Civil War years, reflecting on the complexities of its issues as a man of the North. Entitled A Wisconsin Yankee in Confederate Bayou Country: The Civil War Reminiscences of a Union General, the memoir was published for the first time in 2009, in an annotated edition edited by historian Samuel C. Hyde, Jr. It is described as "less celebration of the grand cause and greater analysis of the motives for his actions—and their inherent contradictions."

Paine died April 14, 1905, in Washington, D.C. He was buried in Arlington National Cemetery.

Works
 Halbert E. Paine, Contested Election, Territory of Utah: George R. Maxwell V. George Q. Cannon, (1888)
 Contested Election, United States Senate: William H. Clagett v. Frederick T. Dubois : before the Committee on Privileges and Elections : argument of Halbert E. Paine, counsel for contestee, Gibson Brothers (1891)
 A Wisconsin Yankee in Confederate Bayou Country: The Civil War Reminiscences of a Union General, ed. by Samuel C. Hyde, Jr., Louisiana State University Press, 2009

See also

 List of American Civil War generals (Union)

References

External links
 Retrieved on 2008-12-01
 "Halbart Eleazer Paine, Major General, United States Army & Member of Congress" at ArlingtonCemetery.net, an unofficial website 

1826 births
1905 deaths
Ohio lawyers
Wisconsin lawyers
Union Army generals
Burials at Arlington National Cemetery
People of Wisconsin in the American Civil War
People from Chardon, Ohio
United States Commissioners of Patents
Washington, D.C., Republicans
Republican Party members of the United States House of Representatives from Wisconsin
19th-century American politicians